Bruno Rodrigo Ferreira da Silva (born 26 January 1994) is a Portuguese footballer who plays as a defender.

Career
Born in Lourosa, Santa Maria da Feira, Silva came through the ranks of FC Porto. He was an unused substitute for the reserves in the Segunda Liga the 2012–13 season. In January 2014, he was one of three reserves called up by manager Paulo Fonseca to train with the first team. On 11 May 2014, Silva made his only professional appearance for Porto B, coming on in added time for Gonçalo Paciência in a 1–0 win at Atlético Clube de Portugal on the final day.

References

External links

Stats and profile at LPFP 

1994 births
Living people
Sportspeople from Santa Maria da Feira
Portuguese footballers
Association football defenders
FC Porto B players
G.D. Ribeirão players
Padroense F.C. players
C.D. Nacional players
Anadia F.C. players
Liga Portugal 2 players